The Force India VJM05 is a Formula One racing car designed by Sahara Force India F1 Team for use in the 2012 Formula One season. The car was launched on 3 February at Silverstone. It was driven by Paul di Resta, and Nico Hülkenberg who returned to the sport after spending one year as Force India's test and reserve driver.

Complete Formula One results
(key) (results in bold indicate pole position; results in italics indicate fastest lap)

 Driver failed to finish the race, but was classified as they had completed greater than 90% of the race distance.

References

External links

Force India Formula One cars